Antlers Municipal Airport  is a public airport  southwest of the central business district of Antlers, a city in Pushmataha County, Oklahoma, United States. It is owned by the City of Antlers.

Facilities and aircraft 
For the 12-month period ending May 15, 2006, the airport had 600 aircraft operations, all of which were general aviation.

References

External links 

Airports in Oklahoma